Kenneth William Haebig (September 2, 1915 – February 2, 1978) was an American politician and lawyer.

Born in West Bend, Wisconsin, Haebig grew up in West Bend. He served in the United States Army during World War II. Haebig received his bachelor's degree from Marquette University and his law degree from Marquette University Law School. He lived in Kewaskum, Wisconsin and practiced law. From 1951 to 1955, Haebig served in the Wisconsin State Assembly and was a Republican. Haebig died in Los Angeles, California.

Notes

1915 births
1978 deaths
People from West Bend, Wisconsin
Military personnel from Wisconsin
Marquette University alumni
Marquette University Law School alumni
Wisconsin lawyers
20th-century American politicians
People from Kewaskum, Wisconsin
20th-century American lawyers
Republican Party members of the Wisconsin State Assembly